Psychotria guerkeana is a species of plant in the family Rubiaceae. It is endemic to São Tomé Island and is listed as vulnerable by the IUCN. It was named and described by Karl Moritz Schumann.

References

guerkeana
Plants described in 1892
Flora of São Tomé Island
Endemic flora of São Tomé and Príncipe
Vulnerable plants
Taxonomy articles created by Polbot